Lincoln County is a county located in the south central part of the U.S. state of Tennessee. As of the 2020 census, the population was 35,319. Its county seat and largest city is Fayetteville. The county is named for Major General Benjamin Lincoln, an officer in the American Revolutionary War.

History
Lincoln County was created in 1809 from parts of Bedford County. The land occupied by the county was part of a land cession obtained from the Cherokee and Chickasaw in 1806.

The Lincoln County Process, used in the distillation of Tennessee whiskey, is named for this county, as the Jack Daniel Distillery was originally located there. However, a subsequent redrawing of county lines resulted in the establishment of adjacent Moore County, which includes the location of the distillery. Another distillery opened in Lincoln County in 1997 – the Benjamin Pritchard's Distillery. However, it does not use the Lincoln County Process for making its Tennessee whiskey. When a law was established in 2013 to require the Lincoln County Process to be used for making all Tennessee whiskey, the Benjamin Pritchard's Distillery was exempted by a grandfather clause. As a result, no current Lincoln County business uses its namesake process.

On March 5, 2017, a poultry farm that distributes products to Tyson Foods was confirmed to have a reported a case of Influenza A virus subtype H7N9 detected in birds resulting in the slaughter of 74,000 chickens.

Geography

Adjacent counties
Bedford County (north)
Moore County (northeast)
Franklin County (east)
Madison County, Alabama (south)
Limestone County, Alabama (southwest)
Giles County (west)
Marshall County (northwest)

State protected areas
Flintville Hatchery Wildlife Management Area

Demographics

2020 census

As of the 2020 United States census, there were 35,319 people, 13,548 households, and 9,264 families residing in the county.

2010 census
As of the 2010 census, there were 33,361 people, 15,241 households, and 4,239 families residing in the county.  The population density was 55 people per square mile (21/km2).  There were 13,999 housing units at an average density of 24 per square mile (9/km2).  The racial makeup of the county was 89.45% White, 6.80% Black or African American, 0.45% Native American, 0.36% Asian, 0.06% Pacific Islander, 1.10% from other races, and 1.78% from two or more races.  2.65% of the population were Hispanic or Latino of any race.

There were 15,241 households, out of which 28% had children under the age of 18 living with them, 58% were married couples living together, 11% had a female head of household with no husband present, and 27% were non-families. 25% of all households were made up of individuals, and 12% had someone living alone who was 65 years of age or older.  The average household size was 2.45 and the average family size was 2.93.

In the county, the population was spread out, with 24% under the age of 18, 8% from 18 to 24, 28% from 25 to 44, 25% from 45 to 64, and 16% who were 65 years of age or older.  The median age was 39 years. For every 100 females there were 93.9 males.  For every 100 females age 18 and over, there were 90.8 males.

The median income for a household in the county was $33,434, and the median income for a family was $41,454. Males had a median income of $30,917 versus $21,722 for females. The per capita income for the county was $18,837.  About 10% of families and 14% of the population were below the poverty line, including 17% of those under age 18 and 20% of those age 65 or over.

Government
Prior to 1968, Lincoln County was a Democratic Party stronghold in presidential elections similar to most other counties in the Solid South. The county backed segregationist George Wallace in 1968, but despite voting Republican for the first time in Richard Nixon’s 49-state 1972 landslide, remained Democratic-leaning up to 1992. Since then, it has become a Republican Party stronghold, with its candidates winning the county by increasing margins with each succeeding presidential election starting with 1996.

The governing body of Lincoln County is the Lincoln County Commission, which is divided into eight districts and 24 commissioners, three from each district. The body is chaired by the County Mayor. The government center of Lincoln County is the Lincoln County Courthouse in Fayetteville.

Communities

Cities

Ardmore (partial)
Fayetteville (county seat)

Town
Petersburg (partial)

Census-designated places
Blanche
Dellrose
Flintville
Park City
Taft

Other unincorporated communities

Belleville
Booneville
Elora
Kelso
Kirkland
Mimosa
Mulberry
New Dellrose
 Shady Grove

Education 
Education in Lincoln County is mostly led by the Lincoln County Department of Education (LCDOE).

Schools in the Lincoln County District

High schools (9 - 12) 
 Lincoln County High School (Tennessee)

Elementary schools/Middle schools (K - 8) 
 Highland Rim Elementary/Middle School
 South Lincoln Elementary/Middle School
 Flintville Elementary/Middle School
 Unity Elementary/Middle School
 Blanche Elementary/Middle School

Schools in the Fayetteville City District 
 Ralph Askins School (Pre-K - 4)
 Fayetteville Middle School (5 - 8)
 Fayetteville High School (9 - 12)

See also
National Register of Historic Places listings in Lincoln County, Tennessee

References

External links

 Official site
 

 
1809 establishments in Tennessee
Populated places established in 1809
Middle Tennessee